1996 Belarusian First League was the sixth season of 2nd level football championship in Belarus. It started in April and ended in November 1996.

Team changes from 1995 season
Winners of 1995 Belarusian First League (Naftan-Devon Novopolotsk) were promoted to Belarusian Premier League. They were replaced by the lowest-placed team of 1995 Premier League (FC Bobruisk).

Khimvolokno Grodno, who finished 15th, relegated to the Second League, but were disbanded before the start of 1996 season. They were replaced by best teams of 1995 Second League (Maxim-Orsha and Stroitel Bereza). Stroitel Bereza, who finished only second in their Second League group, were promoted instead of MPKC-2 Minsk (who were ineligible for promotion as a farm club).

FC Bobruisk dissolved shortly after the end 1995 season. No other club was accepted to replace them and the league was left once again with 15 clubs instead of 16.

Before the start of the season KPF Slonim were renamed to Kommunalnik Slonim. Second League winners Maxim-Orsha were renamed to Maxim-Legmash Orsha. Brestbytkhim Brest relocated to the city of Kobrin and were renamed to FC Kobrin.

Overview
In June, after 8th matchday, Fomalgaut Borisov and Kimovets Vitebsk withdrew from the league and disbanded. Both clubs were excluded from the table (having not played at least half of the scheduled games), their results were annulled and only 13 clubs continued and finished the season.

Transmash Mogilev won the league and were promoted to Premier League, as were league runners-up Kommunalnik Slonim. No team initially relegated to the Second League as the league was expanded to 16 teams in 1997, although Kobrin withdrew to amateur lever before the start of the next season due to financial troubles.

Teams and locations

League table

Top goalscorers

See also
1996 Belarusian Premier League
1995–96 Belarusian Cup
1996–97 Belarusian Cup

External links
RSSSF

Belarusian First League seasons
2
Belarus
Belarus